The Student Cockade is a rightwing souverainist French student union, founded in 2015 at the University of Paris II Panthéon-Assas in France. It claims presence in 22 different universities across France.

History
The Student Cockade was founded on 6 May 2015 in the Panthéon-Assas University as a split of the already existing right wing student union Union nationale inter-universitaire (UNI), it was founded as a way to unite the different youth wings of the right wing political parties in France, (mostly, Droite Populaire, Front national, Debout la France, Parti chrétien-démocrate)

During the year 2018 the Student Cockade was made famous by its fierce and sometimes violent opposition to university blocus.

During the student elections of 2019 at the University of Nanterre, fighting broke out between a group of Student Cockade members and left wing antifascists groups, the student cockade won multiple seats after the incident.

During the 2020 student elections in France, numerous incident opposed the student cockade to left wing student groups and antifascist mouvements, but the Student Cockade managed to win multiple seats in Sorbonne, Assas, Nanterre and other universities.

Organisation

See also 
Union nationale inter-universitaire

References

External links 
Official Website

Conservatism in France